Silvio Daer Fernández Dos Santos (born June 3, 1974 in Melo, Uruguay) is a Uruguayan footballer currently playing for Cerro Largo of the Segunda División Uruguaya.

Honours

Club
Santiago Wanderers
Primera División de Chile (1): 2001
Racing Club de Montevideo
 Uruguayan Segunda División (1): 2007–08

References
 

1974 births
Living people
People from Melo, Uruguay
Uruguayan footballers
Uruguayan expatriate footballers
Uruguay international footballers
Club Nacional de Football players
Defensor Sporting players
Provincial Osorno footballers
Rangers de Talca footballers
Club Deportivo Palestino footballers
Colo-Colo footballers
Santiago Wanderers footballers
Universidad de Concepción footballers
Chiapas F.C. footballers
Hispano players
Racing Club de Montevideo players
Chilean Primera División players
Liga Nacional de Fútbol Profesional de Honduras players
Expatriate footballers in Chile
Expatriate footballers in Mexico
Expatriate footballers in Honduras
Expatriate footballers in Guatemala
Expatriate football managers in Chile
Expatriate football managers in Guatemala
Association football forwards
Uruguayan football managers